Archi may refer to:

Places
Afghanistan
Dasht-e-Archi District, Kunduz Province

Iran
Archi, Iran, in Mazandaran Province

Italy
Archi, Abruzzo, a comune in the Province of Chieti

Palestinian territories
Archi (Old Testament), an Old Testament city near Bethel in Ramallah and al-Bireh Governorate

Russia
Archib, also known as Archi, a village in Charodinsky District, Dagestan

Religion
Archi (Hindu goddess), one of avatars of goddess Lakshmi

Archi(sun ray),the first light ray of sun that falls in the morning.

People and languages
Archi people, an ethnic group in Dagestan, Russia
The Archi language, a Northeast Caucasian language spoken by the Archi people

Science and technology
Archi (software), an Enterprise Architecture modelling tool
 List of commonly used taxonomic affixes (for the prefix "archi-")